The Georgetown University Law Center is the law school of Georgetown University in the Capitol Hill district of Washington, D.C. Established in 1870, it is the second largest law school in the United States and receives more full-time applications than any other law school in the country.

The oldest Jesuit law school in the United States, Georgetown Law is one of the "T14" law schools, that is, schools that have consistently ranked within the top 14 law schools since U.S. News & World Report began publishing rankings. Although it has notably produced many prominent public officials, the school's alumni have entered a diverse array of fields and legal disciplines.

Academia
Evelyn Aswad, J.D. 1995,  Herman G. Kaiser Chair in International Law at the University of Oklahoma College of Law, member of Facebook's independent Oversight Board 
Ian C. Ballon, LL.M. '88, Professor of Law at Stanford University
Robert J. Cottrol, '84, Professor of Law at George Washington University Law School
Nora Demleitner, LL.M.  '94, President of St. John's College - Annapolis, former Dean of the Washington and Lee University School of Law and former Dean of Maurice A. Deane School of Law
Noura Erakat, LL.M. 2012, Professor of Law at George Mason University School of Law
[[Joseph L. Fink III, J.D. 1973, Professor of Pharmacy Law and Policy at University of Kentucky College of Pharmacy
Allison Garrett, LL.M  '91, former Walmart Vice President/Legal Counsel; current president of Emporia State University
Maura R. Grossman, '99, Research Professor in the David R. Cheriton School of Computer Science at the University of Waterloo

Business
Kary Antholis, '89, President of HBO Miniseries and Academy Award-winning documentary filmmaker
Denise Bode, LL.M., CEO of the American Wind Energy Association
David G. Bradley, '83, founder of the Advisory Board Company and owner of the Atlantic Media Company
Joe Garagiola, Jr., '75, Senior Vice President for Standards and On-Field Operations for Major League Baseball (2011–present), Senior Vice President and General Manager for the Arizona Diamondbacks (1997–2005)
Scott Ginsburg, '78, founding owner of Boardwalk Auto Group, radio broadcasting mogul
Thomas E. Leavey, 1923, co-founder of Farmers Insurance, co-founder of the Thomas and Dorothy Leavey Foundation
Douglas Leeds, '96, CEO of IAC Publishing, former CEO of Ask.com
Mark Murphy, '88, President and CEO of the Green Bay Packers (2007–present); former Pro Bowl safety, two-time Super Bowl champion, Washington Redskins
Carmen Policy, '66, President and CEO of the San Francisco 49ers (1991–1999), President and CEO of the Cleveland Browns (1999–2004)
Chris Sacca, '00, billionaire venture capitalist 
Thomas Schlafly, '77, President and co-founder of Saint Louis Brewery
Michael Slive, LL.M. '66, Commissioner of the Southeastern Conference
Mark Weinberger, LL.M. '91, Global Chairman and CEO of Ernst & Young LLP (2013–present), former Assistant Secretary for Tax Policy at the U.S. Treasury
 Ralph V. Whitworth, ‘85, Founder, Relational Investors; Interim Chairman of the Board, Hewlett-Packard.

Government and politics

Federal officials
Horace M. Albright, 1916, Director of the National Park Service (1929–1933)
Elizabeth Frawley Bagley, '87, U.S. Ambassador to Portugal (1994–1997) 
Robert C. Bonner, '66, Commissioner of the United States Customs and Border Protection (2001–2005), Administrator of the Drug Enforcement Administration (1990–1993), judge on the U.S. District Court for the Central District of California (1989), U.S. Attorney for the Central District of California (1984–1989)
Bradford P. Campbell, Assistant Secretary of Labor (2007–2009)
George Cortelyou, 1895, U.S. Secretary of the Treasury (1907–1909), U.S. Postmaster General (1905–1907), U.S. Secretary of Commerce and Labor (1903–1904)
John Dean, '65, White House Counsel (1970–1973), convicted of involvement in the Watergate Scandal
Charles H. Fahy, 1914, U.S. Solicitor General (1941–1945)
Lee A. Feinstein, U.S. Ambassador to Poland (2009–2012), Principal Deputy Director of the Policy Planning Staff of the U.S. Department of State (1995–2001)
Douglas Feith, '78, Undersecretary of Defense for Policy (2001–2005)
Laurie S. Fulton, '89, U.S. Ambassador to Denmark (2009–2013)
Mark Gearan, '91, Director of the Peace Corps (1995–1999), White House Communications Director (1993–1995), White House Deputy Chief of Staff for Policy (1993)
Mark Gitenstein, '72, U.S. Ambassador to Romania (2009–2012), former Chief Counsel to the Senate Committee on the Judiciary during the Robert Bork Supreme Court nomination
Avril Haines, '01, Director of National Intelligence (since 2021), Deputy National Security Advisor (2014–2017), former Deputy Director of the Central Intelligence Agency and the first woman to hold that post
Robert O. Harris, LL.M. '61, Chairman of the National Mediation Board
Mickey Kantor, '68, U.S. Secretary of Commerce (1996–1997)
Jacob Lew, '83, U.S. Secretary of the Treasury (2013–2017), White House Chief of Staff (2012–2013), Director of the Office of Management and Budget (2010–2012)
Robert Lighthizer, '73, United States Trade Representative (2017–2021)
Shavit Matias, LL.M. ‘91, Deputy Attorney General of Israel (2004–2013); Hoover Institution, Stanford University (2013–present)
Don McGahn, LL.M. '02, White House Counsel (2017–2018)
Gerald S. McGowan, '74, U.S. Ambassador to Portugal (1997–2001)
Beth Nolan, '80, White House Counsel (1999–2001), Senior Vice President and General Counsel at George Washington University (2007–present)
Mark Paoletta, '87, Chief Counsel to Vice President Michael Pence (2017–present)
John Podesta, '76, White House Chief of Staff (1998–2001), President of Center for American Progress (2001–2013)
Kenneth Allen Polite Jr., '00, U.S. Attorney for the Eastern District of Louisiana (2013–2017)
Jerome Powell, '79, Chair of the Federal Reserve (2018–present), Member of the Federal Reserve Board of Governors (2012–present), Under Secretary of the Treasury for Domestic Finance (1992–1993)
Michael Powell, '93, Chairman of the Federal Communications Commission (2001–2005)
Jack Quinn, '75, White House Counsel (1995–1997)
Kathryn Ruemmler, '96, White House Counsel (2011–2014)
Nicholas A. Trutanich, '05, United States Attorney for the District of Nevada (2019–2021)
Barbara D. Underwood, '69, acting United States Solicitor General (2001), acting New York Attorney General (2018-2019), New York Solicitor General (2007–present)
James Uthmeier, former senior adviser, U.S. Department of Commerce 
Christine A. Varney, '85, Federal Trade Commissioner (1994–1997), U.S. Assistant Attorney General for the Antitrust Division (2009–2011)
Robert Wilkie, LL.M. '92, United States Secretary of Veterans Affairs (2018–2021)
Monty Wilkinson, '88, acting United States Attorney General (2021)
Judith A. Winston, ‘77, Undersecretary (1999-2001) and General Counsel (1993-2001) United States Department of Education
Douglas Feith, '78, Undersecretary of Defense for Policy

Members of U.S. Congress
William B. Bankhead, 1895, U.S. Speaker of the House during the New Deal (1936–1940), U.S. Representative from Alabama (1917–1940), member of the first University of Alabama football team, father of actress Tallulah Bankhead
Bob Barr, '87, U.S. Representative from Georgia (1995–2003), United States Libertarian Party Presidential Candidate (2008)
George A. Bartlett, 1894, U.S. Representative from Nevada (1907–1911)
Herbert H. Bateman, '56, U.S. Representative from Virginia (1983–2000)
Robert Bauman, '64, U.S. Representative from Maryland (1973–1981)
Alan Bible, '34, U.S. Senator from Nevada (1954–1974)
Coleman Livingston Blease, 1889, U.S. Senator from South Carolina (1925–1931), Governor of South Carolina (1911–1915)
J. Caleb Boggs, '37, U.S. Senator from Delaware (1961–1973); Governor of Delaware (1953–1960); U.S. Representative from Delaware (1947–1953)
Bruce Faulkner Caputo, '71, U.S. Representative from New York (1977–1979)
Dennis Chavez, '20, U.S. Senator from New Mexico (1935–1962)
David Cicilline, '86, U.S. Representative from Rhode Island (2011–present), first openly gay mayor of a U.S. state capitol (Providence)
Hansen Clarke, '87, U.S. Representative from Michigan (2011–2013)
Charles R. Clason, 1914, U.S. Representative from Massachusetts (1937–1949)
L. Gary Clemente, '31, U.S. Representative from New York (1949–1953)
Barbara Comstock, '86, U.S. Representative from Virginia (2015–2019), Member of the Virginia House of Delegates (2010–2014)
Charles F. Curry, Jr., 1912, U.S. Representative from California (1931–1933)
John Delaney, '88, U.S. Representative from Maryland (2013–2019)
John Dingell, '52, U.S. Representative from Michigan (1955–2015)
John J. Douglass, 1896, U.S. Representative from Massachusetts (1925–1933)
Robert Drinan, '50, U.S. Representative from Massachusetts (1971–1973)
Richard Durbin, '69, U.S. Senator from Illinois (1997–present), Senate Democratic Whip (2005–present)
John A. Durkin, '65, U.S. Senator from New Hampshire (1975–1980)
Clarence D. Van Duzer, 1893, U.S. Representative from Nevada (1903–1907)
Lane Evans, '78, U.S. Representative from Illinois (1983–2007)
John Faso, '79, U.S. Representative from New York (2017–2019), Republican candidate for the Governor of New York (2006), Minority Leader of the New York State Assembly (1998–2002)
Lois Frankel, '73, U.S. Representative from Florida (2013–present)
Martin Frost, '70, U.S. Representative from Texas (1979–2005)
Mazie Hirono, '78, U.S. Senator from Hawaii (2013–present), U.S. Representative from Hawaii (2007–2013), Lieutenant Governor of Hawaii (1994–2003)
Steny Hoyer, '66, U.S. Representative from Maryland (1981–present), House Majority Leader (2007–2011, 2019–present), House Democratic Whip (2003-2007, 2011–2019)
Michael L. Igoe, 1908, U.S. Representative from Illinois (1935), U.S. Attorney for the Northern District of Illinois (1935–1939), judge for the U.S. District Court for the Northern District of Illinois (1939–1965)
James Robert Jones, '64, U.S. Representative from Oklahoma (1983–1987), U.S. Ambassador to Mexico (1993–1997)
Bill Jefferson, LL.M. '95, U.S. Representative from Louisiana (1991–2009)
Mark Kirk, '92, U.S. Senator from Illinois (2010–2016)
Anne McLane Kuster, '84, U.S. Representative from New Hampshire (2013–present)
John W. Langley, U.S. Representative from Kentucky (1907–1926)
Edward L. Leahy, 1908, U.S. Senator (1949–1950), judge on the U.S. District Court for the District of Rhode Island (1951–1953)
Patrick Leahy, '64, U.S. Senator from Vermont (1975–2023), President pro tempore of the U.S. Senate (2012–2023), Chairman or Ranking Member of the Senate Judiciary Committee (2007–2023)
George Swinton Legare, 1893, U.S. Representative from South Carolina (1903–1913)
Ted Lieu, '94, U.S. Representative from California (2015–present)
Dan Lungren, '71, U.S. Representative from California (2005–2013)
George Mitchell, '61, U.S. Senator from Maine (1980–1995), Senate Majority Leader (1989–1995), United States Special Envoy for Northern Ireland (1995–2001), Chairman of the Board of The Walt Disney Company (2004–2006), U.S. Special Envoy for Middle East Peace (2009–2011), author of the Mitchell Report on the Arab-Israeli Conflict (2001) and Mitchell Report on the use of performance-enhancing drugs in baseball (2007)
Joseph C. O'Mahoney, '20, U.S. Senator from Wyoming (1954-1961; 1934-1953)
Francis Rooney, '78, U.S. Representative from Florida (2017–2021), U.S. Ambassador to the Holy See (2005–2008)
Stephanie Herseth Sandlin, '97, U.S. Representative from South Dakota (2004–2010)
Daniel S. Sullivan, '93, U.S. Senator from Alaska (2015–present), Alaska Attorney General (2009–2010)
Chris Van Hollen, '90, U.S. Senator from Maryland (2017–present), U.S. Representative from Maryland (2003–2016)
Pete Visclosky, LL.M. '82, U.S. Representative from Indiana (1985–present)
James H. Webb, '75, U.S. Senator from Virginia (2007–2013), U.S. Secretary of the Navy (1987–1988), author
Rick White, '80, U.S. Representative from Washington (1995–1999)
Frank Wolf, '65, U.S. Representative from Virginia (1981–2015)
Albert Wynn, '77, U.S. Representative from Maryland (1993–2008)

State and local administration
Jerry Abramson, '71, Lieutenant Governor of Kentucky (2011–2014), Mayor of Louisville, Kentucky (1986–2011)
Sam Arora, '10, Member of the Maryland House of Delegates (2011–2014)
Chaz Beasley, '13, Member of the North Carolina House of Representatives (2016-2020)
Jesus Borja, '74, Lieutenant Governor of the Northern Mariana Islands (1994–1998)
 Michael N. Castle, '64, Governor of Delaware (1985–1992), U.S. Representative from Delaware (1993–2011)
David Catania, '94, Member of the D.C. City Council (1997–2015)
John Chiang, California State Treasurer (2015–2019), California State Controller (2007–2015)
Sean Coffey, '87, Candidate for New York State Attorney General in 2010
Peter Tali Coleman, '51, Governor of American Samoa (1956–1961, 1978–1985, 1989–1993)
Mitch Daniels, '79, Governor of Indiana (2005–2013), Director of the Office of Management and Budget (2001–2003), President of Purdue University (2013–present)
Christopher Del Sesto, Governor of Rhode Island (1959–1961), Justice of the Rhode Island Supreme Court (1966–1973)
Michael Delaney, '94, New Hampshire Attorney General (2009–2013)
John J. Easton, Jr., '70, Vermont Attorney General (1981–1985)
Frank S. Farley, '25, New Jersey State Senator and mob and political boss notorious as the leader of the Atlantic City, New Jersey political machine and criminal organization 
Pat Collier Frank, '53, Member of the Florida State Senate (1978–1999), among the first class of women admitted to Georgetown Law
Jim Graham, LL.M., Member of the D.C. City Council (1999–2017)
David Grosso, '01, Member of the D.C. City Council (2013–present)
Derek Hodge, '71, Lieutenant Governor of the United States Virgin Islands (1987–1995)
Brad Hutto, '81, Member of the South Carolina Senate, Candidate for U.S. Senate in 2014
Jeff Johnson, '92, Republican candidate for Governor of Minnesota in 2018 and 2014, Member of the Minnesota House of Representatives (2001–2007)
Ash Kalra, '96, California State Assembly (2016–present)
Jason Kander, '05, Member of the Missouri House of Representatives (2009–2013), Missouri Secretary of State (2013–2017)
Adam Laxalt, '05, Nevada Attorney General (2015-2019), Republican candidate for Governor of Nevada in 2018
John Lynch, '84, Governor of New Hampshire (2005–2013)
 Dorothy McAuliffe, First Lady of the Virginia (2014–2018)
 Terry McAuliffe, '84, Governor of Virginia (2014–2018), Chairman of the Democratic National Committee (2001–2005)
 Jim McGreevey, '81, Governor of New Jersey (2002–2004)
 Vincent Orange, LL.M. '88, Member of the D.C. City Council (1998–2007, 2011-2016)
 Clay Pell, '08, Candidate for Governor of Rhode Island in 2014
 James Patrick Rossiter, 1916, Mayor of Erie, Pennsylvania (1932–1936)
 Josh Shapiro, '02, Attorney General of Pennsylvania (2017—present), Member of the Pennsylvania House of Representatives (2005–2012)
 Don Siegelman, '72, Governor of Alabama (1999–2003)
 Sheila Simon, '87, Lieutenant Governor of Illinois (2011–2015)
 John D. Spellman, '53, Governor of Washington (1981–1985)
 Cyrus Vance, Jr., '82, New York County District Attorney (2010–present)
 R. Seth Williams, '92, District Attorney of Philadelphia (2009–2017)
 Robert Zirkin, '98, Member of the Maryland State Senate (2007–2020)

Other politics
Jack Abramoff, '86, lobbyist and businessman who was a central figure in a series of high-profile political scandals
Gary Bauer, '73, President of the Family Research Council (1988–1999) and conservative activist
Tim Canova, '88, Professor of Law at Nova Southeastern University Law School, Challenger to Debbie Wasserman Schultz for Florida's 23rd congressional district
Pamela Coke-Hamilton Director of International Trade for UNCTAD 
Brian Concannon, '89, founding Director of the Institute for Justice and Democracy in Haiti
Stephanie Cutter, '97, political consultant and Deputy Campaign Manager for Barack Obama's 2012 presidential reelection campaign
Sandra Fluke, '12, women's rights activist
 Barry W. Lynn, '78, Executive Director of Americans United for Separation of Church and State
 Paul Manafort, '74, chief strategist for the Donald Trump presidential campaign, 2016, lobbyist known for representing prominent dictators
 Maeve Kennedy McKean, '09, Senior Advisor on Human Rights to the United States Department of State's global AIDS program and to the Office of Global Affairs at the U.S. Department of Health and Human Services
 John Sears, '63, campaign manager for Ronald Reagan in 1976 and 1980
 Michael Steele, '91, Chairman of the Republican National Committee (2009–2011), Lieutenant Governor of Maryland (2003–2007)
 Caren Z. Turner, '85, co-chairwoman of the super PAC Ready for Hillary
 Jeff Weaver, '96, campaign manager for Bernie Sanders presidential campaign, 2016
 Juan José Gómez Camacho Permanent Representative of Mexico to the United Nations
 Francis Escudero, LL.M., '96, Senator of the Philippines, Former Governor of Sorsogon

Judiciary

Federal court
Jesse C. Adkins, LL.B. 1899, LL.M. 1900, judge on the U.S. District Court for the District of Columbia (1930–1955)
Thomas L. Ambro, '75, judge on the U.S. Court of Appeals for the Third Circuit (2000–present)
Michael Anello, '68, judge on the U.S. District Court for the Southern District of California (2008–present)
Robert Armen, '73, judge on the United States Tax Court
William G. Bassler, '63, judge on the U.S. District Court for the District of New Jersey (1991–2006)
Walter M. Bastian, 1913, judge on the U.S. Court of Appeals for the District of Columbia Circuit (1954–1975)
Terrence Berg, '86, judge on the U.S. District Court for the Eastern District of Michigan (2012–present)
Francisco Besosa, '79, judge on the U.S. District Court for the District of Puerto Rico (2006–present)
James K. Bredar, '82, judge on the U.S. District Court for the District of Maryland (2010–present)
Lynn J. Bush, '76, judge on the United States Court of Federal Claims (1998–present)
Richard C. Casey, '58, judge on the U.S. District Court for the Southern District of New York (1997–2007)
Thomas Clary, 1924, judge on the U.S. District Court for the Eastern District of Pennsylvania (1950–1977)
Robert N. Chatigny, '78, judge on the U.S. District Court for the District of Connecticut (2004–present)
David Chávez, 1922, judge on the U.S. District Court for the District of Puerto Rico (1947–1950), Justice of the New Mexico Supreme Court (1960–1968)
Pamela K. Chen, '86, judge on the U.S. District Court for the Eastern District of New York (2013–present)
Carolyn Chiechi, '69, LL.M. '71, judge on the United States Tax Court (1992–2007)
Charles N. Clevert, Jr., '72, judge on the U.S. District Court for the Eastern District of Wisconsin (1996–present)
John David Clifford, Jr., 1913, judge on the U.S. District Court for the District of Maine (1947–1956), U.S. Attorney for the District of Maine (1933–1947)
John O. Colvin, LL.M. '78, judge on the United States Tax Court (1998–present, chief judge 2006–present)
Patrick Anthony Conmy, '59, judge on the U.S. District Court for the District of North Dakota (1985–present, chief judge 1985–1992)
Julian Abele Cook, Jr., '57, judge on the U.S. District Court for the Eastern District of Michigan (1979–present, chief judge 1989–1996)
Virginia M. Hernandez Covington, '80, judge on the U.S. District Court for the Middle District of Florida (2004–present)
Ronald Davies, '30, judge on the U.S. District Court for the District of North Dakota (1955–1985) who while on temporary assignment in Little Rock, Arkansas presided over the Little Rock Integration Crisis in 1957
Robert N. Davis, '78, judge on the United States Court of Appeals for Veterans Claims (2004–present)
John T. Elfvin, '47, judge on the U.S. District Court for the Western District of New York (1974–2009), U.S. Attorney for the Western District of New York (1972–1975)
Charles H. Fahy, 1914, judge on the U.S. Court of Appeals for the District of Columbia Circuit (1950–1979)
Walter Heen, '55, judge on the U.S. District Court for the District of Hawaii (1981), U.S. Attorney for the District of Hawaii
John M. Facciola, '69, Magistrate Judge for the U.S. District Court for the District of Columbia (1997–present)
D. Michael Fisher, '69, judge on the U.S. Court of Appeals for the Third Circuit (2003–present), Attorney General of Pennsylvania (1997–2003)
Arthur J. Gajarsa, '67, judge on the U.S. Court of Appeals for the Federal Circuit (1997–2012)
Marvin J. Garbis, LL.M. '62, judge on the U.S. District Court for the District of Maryland (1989–present)
Ashley Mulgrave Gould, 1884, judge on the U.S. District Court for the District of Columbia (1902–1921), U.S. Attorney for the District of Columbia (1901–1902)
Thomas Hardiman, '90, judge on the U.S. Court of Appeals for the Third Circuit (2007–present)
George J. Hazel, '99, judge on the U.S. District Court for the District of Maryland (2014–present)
Judith C. Herrera, '79, judge on the U.S. District Court for the District of New Mexico (2003–present)
William Hitz, 1900, judge on the U.S. Court of Appeals for the District of Columbia Circuit (1931–1935)
Michael Robert Hogan, '71, judge on the U.S. District Court for the District of Oregon (1991–2012, chief judge 1995–2002)
Thomas F. Hogan, '66, judge on the United States Foreign Intelligence Surveillance Court (2009–present), judge on the U.S. District Court for the District of Columbia (1982–present, chief judge 2001 – 2008)
Ellen Lipton Hollander, '74, judge on the U.S. District Court for the District of Maryland (2010–present)
Jerome A. Holmes, '88, judge on the U.S. Court of Appeals for the Tenth Circuit (2006–present)
Jeffrey R. Howard, '81, judge on U.S. Court of Appeals for the First Circuit (2002–present)
Brian Anthony Jackson, LL.M. '00, judge on the U.S. District Court for the Middle District of Louisiana (2010–present)
Kent A. Jordan, '84, judge on the U.S. Court of Appeals for the Third Circuit (2006–present)
Norma Johnson, '62, judge on the U.S. District Court for the District of Columbia (1980–2003, chief judge 1997–2001), first African-American woman to serve as chief judge of a U.S. District Court 
Elaine D. Kaplan, '79, judge on the U.S. Court of Federal Claims (2013–present), acting Director of the U.S Office of Personnel Management (2013)
Richmond Keech, LL.B. 1922, LL.M. 1923, judge on the U.S. District Court for the District of Columbia (1947–1986, chief judge 1966)
Charles B. Kornmann, '62, judge on the U.S. District Court for the District of South Dakota (1995–present)
Bruce E. Kasold, LL.M. '82, judge on the United States Court of Appeals for Veterans Claims (2003–present)
Paul Kilday, 1922, judge on the U.S. Court of Appeals for the Armed Forces (1961–1968)
Mark R. Kravitz, '75, judge on the U.S. District Court for the District of Connecticut (2003–2012)
Joseph Normand Laplante, '90, judge on the U.S. District Court for the District of New Hampshire (2007–present)
Bolitha James Laws, LL.B. 1913, LL.M. 1914, judge on the U.S. District Court for the District of Columbia (1938–1958, chief judge 1945–1958)
Joseph Patrick Lieb, 1924, judge on the U.S. District Court for the Middle District of Florida (1962–1971, chief judge 1966–1971)
Richard Linn, '69, judge on the U.S. Court of Appeals for the Federal Circuit (2000–present)
Frank J. Magill, '55, judge on the U.S. Court of Appeals for the Eighth Circuit (1986–2013), father of Stanford Law School Dean M. Elizabeth Magill
Kiyo A. Matsumoto, '81, judge on the U.S. District Court for the Eastern District of New York (2008–present)
Roslynn R. Mauskopf, '82, judge on the U.S. District Court for the Eastern District of New York (2007–present), U.S. Attorney for the Eastern District of New York (2002–2007), Inspector General of the State of New York (1995–2002)
Steven J. McAuliffe, '73, judge on U.S. District Court for the District of New Hampshire (1992–present), widower of astronaut Christa McAuliffe
Joseph Charles McGarraghy, 1921, judge on the U.S. District Court for the District of Columbia (1965–1975)
M. Margaret McKeown, '75, judge on the U.S. Court of Appeals for the Ninth Circuit (1998–present), first female partner at Perkins Coie
Sean J. McLaughlin, '80, judge on the U.S. District Court for the Western District of Pennsylvania (1994–2013, chief judge 2013), general counsel and vice-president of the Erie Insurance Group (2013–present)
Mildred Methvin, '76, United States Magistrate judge for the Western District of Louisiana, based in Lafayette, 1983-2009  
Kimberly Ann Moore, '94, judge on the U.S. Court of Appeals for the Federal Circuit (2006–present)
Frank Jerome Murray, 1929, judge on the U.S. District Court for the District of Massachusetts (1967–1995)
Frank Herbert Norcross, 1894, judge on the U.S. District Court for the District of Nevada (1928–1952), Justice of the Supreme Court of Nevada (1904–1916)
Daniel William O'Donoghue, LL.B. 1899, LL.M. 1900, judge on the U.S. District Court for the District of Columbia (1932–1948)
Fred I. Parker, '65, judge on the U.S. Court of Appeals for the Second Circuit (1994–2003)
Jaime Pieras, Jr., '48, judge on the U.S. District Court for the District of Puerto Rico (1982–2011)
David Andrew Pine, 1913, judge on the U.S. District Court for the District of Columbia (1940–1970, chief judge 1959–1961), U.S. Attorney for the District of Columbia (1938–1940)
E. Barrett Prettyman, 1915, judge on the U.S. Court of Appeals for the District of Columbia Circuit (1945–1971, chief judge 1958–1960)
Robert Renner, '49, judge on the U.S. District Court for the District of Minnesota (1980–2005), U.S. Attorney for the District of Minnesota (1969–1977)
James L. Robart, '73, judge on the U.S. District Court for the Western District of Washington (2004–present)
K. Gary Sebelius, '74, magistrate judge on the U.S. District Court for the District of Kansas (2003–present)
Patricia Seitz, '73, judge on the U.S. District Court for the Southern District of Florida (1998–present)
Thomas Michael Shanahan, '59, judge on the U.S. District Court for the District of Nebraska (1993–2004), Justice of the Nebraska Supreme Court (1983–1993)
Edward F. Shea, '70, judge on the U.S. District Court for the Eastern District of Washington (1997–present)
Dennis Shedd, LL.M. '80, judge on the U.S. Court of Appeals for the Fourth Circuit (1990—present)
Eugene Edward Siler, Jr., LL.M. '64, judge on the U.S. Court of Appeals for the Sixth Circuit (1991–present)
John Sirica, 1926, judge on the U.S. District Court for the District of Columbia (1957–1974, chief judge 1971–1974); presided over the Watergate trials; named TIME magazine's Man of the Year in 1973
John Lewis Smith, Jr., LL.B. '38, LL.M. '39, judge on the United States District Court for the District of Columbia (1966–1992, chief judge 1981–1982)
William E. Smith, '87, judge on the U.S. District Court for the District of Rhode Island, chief judge (2013–present)
Timothy C. Stanceu, '79, judge on the U.S. Court of International Trade (2003–present)
George Clinton Sweeney, 1922, judge on the U.S. District Court for the District of Massachusetts (1935–1966, chief judge 1948–1965)
Edward Allen Tamm, '30, judge on the U.S. Court of Appeals for the District of Columbia Circuit (1965–1985)
Robert Timlin, '59, judge on the U.S. District Court for the Central District of California (1994–present)
Roger W. Titus, '66, judge on the U.S. District Court for the District of Maryland (2003–present)
Ricardo M. Urbina, '70, judge on the U.S. District Court for the District of Columbia (1994–2012)
James A. Walsh, 1928, judge on the U.S. District Court for the District of Arizona (1952–1991, chief judge 1961–1972)
David C. Westenhaver, 1886, judge on the U.S. District Court for the Northern District of Ohio (1917–1928)
Ashton Hilliard Williams, 1915, judge on the United States District Court for the Eastern District of South Carolina (1952–1962)
Douglas P. Woodlock, '75, judge on the U.S. District Court for the District of Massachusetts (1986–present)
Jennifer Guerin Zipps, '90, judge on the U.S. District Court for the District of Arizona (2011–present)
Rodolfo Ruiz, '05, judge on the U.S. District Court for the Southern District of Florida (2019–present)

State court
 A. G. C. Bierer, (1886) Associate Justice of the Oklahoma Territory Supreme Court (1896-1904)
 Richard C. Bosson, '69, Justice of the New Mexico Supreme Court (2002–2015)
 J. J. P. Corrigan, '25, Associate Justice of the Ohio Supreme Court (1969–1976)
 Robert E. Davis, '64, Justice of the Kansas Supreme Court (1993–present), Chief Justice (2009–2010)
 Gene Franchini, '60, Justice of the New Mexico Supreme Court (1990–2002, Chief Justice 1997–1999)
 Lorie Skjerven Gildea, '86, Associate Justice of the Minnesota Supreme Court (2006–2010), Chief Justice (2010–present)
 Henry P. Hughes, 1927, Justice of the Wisconsin Supreme Court (1948–1951)
 Rives Kistler, '81, Associate Justice of the Oregon Supreme Court (2003–2018), first openly gay state Supreme Court justice in the United States
 Stephen P. Lamb, '75, Delaware Court of Chancery Vice Chancellor
 Frank G. Mahady, '64, Associate Justice of the Vermont Supreme Court (1987–1988), Judge of the Vermont District Court (1982–1992)
 Bill Mims, LL.M. '86, Justice of the Supreme Court of Virginia (2010–present), Attorney General of Virginia (2009–2010)
 Michael Musmanno, LL.B., 1918, Associate Justice of the Supreme Court of Pennsylvania (1951-1968)
 Vanessa Ruiz, Associate Judge of the District of Columbia Court of Appeals (1994–2011)
 Joseph T. Walsh, '54, Justice of the Delaware Supreme Court (1985–2005)
 Robert A. Zarnoch, '74, Judge on the Maryland Court of Special Appeals (2008–2015)

Foreign courts
 Gregory Dolin, J.D. '04, Associate Justice of the Supreme Court of Palau
 Judith M. Woods, LL.M. '78, Justice of the Canadian Federal Court of Appeal (2016–present)

Prominent lawyers
 Robert S. Bennett, '64, senior partner at Hogan Lovells; represented President Bill Clinton during the Monica Lewinsky hearings
 Thomas Hale Boggs, Jr., '65, chairman of Patton Boggs
 Ty Cobb, '78, senior partner at Hogan Lovells; represented President Donald Trump during the Mueller Investigation
 Stephen L. Braga, '81, represented Martin Tankleff and the West Memphis Three
 Alan Gura, '95, successfully argued District of Columbia v. Heller
 Stephen Halbrook, '78, litigator for the NRA, successfully argued Printz v. United States
 Shon Hopwood, LL.M. '17, filer of multiple successful petitions for certiorari with the Supreme Court as a jailhouse lawyer in federal prison prior to obtaining his law degree; criminal justice advocate
 Charles LiMandri, argued the Mount Soledad Cross case, the longest running First Amendment case in history
 William "Bill" Shea, LL.B. '31, co-founder of Shea & Gould, instrumental in the founding of the New York Mets and New York Islanders
 Brendan Sullivan, '67, senior partner at Williams & Connolly; represented Oliver North during the Iran-Contra affair
 Edward Bennett Williams, '44, co-founder of Williams & Connolly; owner and president of the Washington Redskins (1969–1979); owner of the Baltimore Orioles (1980–1988)

Other
Joan Biskupic, '93, Editor in Charge, Legal Affairs for Reuters; author of several books on the Supreme Court 
Joyce Chiang, '95, Immigration and Naturalization Service attorney whose murder drew comparisons to the murder of Chandra Levy
James C. Duff, '81, President and CEO of the Newseum and Freedom Forum, Director of the Administrative Office of the U.S. Courts (2006–2011)
Susie Gelman, activist and philanthropist
Savannah Guthrie, '02, co-anchor of The Today Show on NBC (2012–present)
Nancy Hogshead-Makar, '97, 1984 Summer Olympics swimming gold medalist and Professor of Law at Florida Coastal School of Law
Herman "Ed" Hollis, 1927, FBI special agent involved in shootouts with John Dillinger and Baby Face Nelson
Bruce Lindsey, '75, Chairman of the Board of the Clinton Foundation; former White House Deputy Legal Counsel
Alan Lipman, '03, commentator on gun violence, mass shootings, and terrorism for CNN, BBC, and MSNBC
John Luessenhop, director of Takers and Texas Chainsaw 3D
Martin Mayhew, '00, American football player and executive
Marilyn Milian, '84, judge of The People's Court and former judge on the Miami Circuit Court
Cara Mund, beauty pageant titleholder
Walter Pincus, '01, Emmy, Pulitzer, and Polk award-winning national security journalist for the Washington Post 
Sammy thrashLife, '11, artist and punk rock musician
Tiffany Trump, daughter of President Donald Trump
Greta Van Susteren, '79, LL.M. '83, anchor of On the Record on the Fox News Channel

Attended but did not graduate
Lyndon B. Johnson, former President of the United States, in 1934
Marjorie Rendell, judge on the United States Court of Appeals for the Third Circuit (1997–present), in 1971
Ilana Rovner, judge on the United States Court of Appeals for the Seventh Circuit (1992–present), in 1964 and 1965
Donald Rumsfeld, former U.S. Secretary of Defense, in 1957
John Yarmuth, U.S. Representative from Kentucky, in 1971 and 1972

Fictional attendees
 Alicia Florrick, lead character in The Good Wife
 Will Gardner, supporting character in The Good Wife
 Olivia Pope, lead character in Scandal
 Harmon Rabb, lead character in JAG
 Charlie Young, supporting character in The West Wing
 Chuck McGill, main cast character and attorney in Better Call Saul, played by Michael McKean

References

Lists of people by educational affiliation in Washington, D.C.
Georgetown University Law alumni
United States law-related lists